Miabi is a territory in Kasai-Oriental province of the Democratic Republic of the Congo.

Territories of Kasaï-Oriental Province